Leap Year is a 2010 romantic comedy directed by Anand Tucker and written by Harry Elfont and Deborah Kaplan. Leap Year stars Amy Adams and Matthew Goode.

The film follows a real estate worker who heads to Ireland to ask her boyfriend to accept her wedding proposal on leap day, when tradition supposedly holds that men will not refuse a woman's proposal for marriage. Her plans are interrupted by a series of events and are further complicated when she hires an Irish innkeeper to take her to her boyfriend in Dublin. Principal photography took place in County Wicklow, Dublin, County Mayo, and County Galway, with filming taking place in and around the Aran Islands, Connemara, Temple Bar, Georgian Dublin, Wicklow National Park, and Olaf Street, Waterford.

Leap Year premiered in New York City on January 6, 2010 and was released theatrically on January 8, 2010, by Universal Pictures in the United States and on February 28 by Optimum Releasing in Ireland. The film received mostly negative reviews from critics, with many criticising the film’s pacing, plot and limited chemistry between Adams and Goode.

Plot
Successful real estate stager Anna Brady is frustrated that her cardiologist boyfriend Jeremy Sloane still has not proposed to her after four years. She decides to travel from Boston to Dublin, to propose to him on February 29, leap day, while he is there at a conference. Anna wishes to invoke an Irish tradition, Bachelor's Day, that a man who is proposed to on leap day must accept the proposal.

During the flight, a storm diverts the plane to Cardiff, Wales. Anna hires a boat to take her west to Cork. The severity of the storm forces her to be put ashore at a small seaside village called Dingle. Anna requests Declan O'Callaghan, a surly Irish innkeeper, to taxi her to Dublin. At first he refuses, but after his tavern is threatened with foreclosure, he agrees to drive her for €500. Along the way, he mocks her belief in a leap year tradition of women proposing to men.

A herd of cows blocks the road. Anna steps in cow dung while attempting to move the animals, and tries to clean her shoes while leaning on Declan's car, which causes it to roll downhill into a stream. Continuing on foot, Anna flags down a van with three travellers who offer her a lift. Ignoring Declan's warning, Anna hands them her luggage. They drive off without her. Anna and Declan make their way on foot to a roadside pub, where they discover the three thieves going through Anna's luggage. Declan fights them and retrieves Anna's bag.

While waiting for a train, they ask each other what they would grab if their homes were on fire and they had only 60 seconds to flee. They lose track of time and miss the train. They are forced to stay at a bed & breakfast in Tipperary, where they pretend to be married so that their conservative hosts will allow them to stay. During dinner, when other couples kiss to show their love for each other, Anna and Declan are "forced" to kiss as well. This stirs feelings that neither had expected. They sleep in the same bed, but do not admit their new feelings for each other.

While hitchhiking, Anna and Declan are caught in a hailstorm and take shelter in a nearby church, where a wedding is taking place. They are invited to the reception, where Anna gets drunk. Anna questions her own intentions with Jeremy and realizes that she has feelings for Declan. Just as the two are about to kiss, Anna vomits and passes out. The following day they arrive in Dublin. Declan reveals he was once engaged but his fiancée ran off to Dublin with his mother's claddagh ring and his best friend. Anna suggests that while in Dublin, he should ask for his mother's ring back. When they arrive at the hotel where Jeremy is staying, Jeremy surprises Anna by proposing to her right in the lobby. Seeing that Declan had already walked out of the hotel, she accepts Jeremy's proposal.

At their engagement party in Boston, Anna learns that Jeremy proposed because he thought it was the only way to appease the co-op board of the apartment building the couple wanted to move into. Dismayed, Anna pulls the fire alarm and waits, testing the 60-second concept she discussed with Declan earlier. Jeremy retrieves all of their electronic materials and neglects to check for Anna. Anna realizes there is nothing in the apartment that means anything to her, including Jeremy. Meanwhile, in Dublin, Declan retrieves his mother's claddagh ring from his ex-fiancée.

Anna returns to the tavern in Dingle, where Declan has pulled together the balance he owed his property owner with the help of the community. She tells him she has broken off her engagement and proposes that they get together, and not make plans. Declan leaves. Thinking she has been rejected, Anna rushes outside to the edge of a cliff overlooking the sea. Declan emerges, revealing that he went out to retrieve his mother's claddagh ring. Declan says he wants to make plans with her, and proposes on the cliffside. Anna happily accepts. They drive away in Declan's car, leaving their destination open to fate.

Cast
 Amy Adams as Anna Brady
 Matthew Goode as Declan O'Callaghan
 Adam Scott as Jeremy Sloane
 John Lithgow as Jack Brady, Anna's father
 Kaitlin Olson as Libby Brady
 Noel O'Donovan as Seamus
 Tony Rohr as Frank
 Pat Laffan as Donal
 Alan Devlin as Joe
 Ian McElhinney as Priest
 Vincenzo Nicoli as Stefano
 Flaminia Cinque as Carla
 Peter O'Meara as Ron
 Dominique McElligott as Bride
 Liza Ross as Edith

Production
On October 17, 2008, it was announced that Amy Adams was to star in the film as Anna Brady. On November 23, Anand Tucker signed on to direct the film, with Harry Elfont and Deborah Kaplan collaborating on the screenplay. 

On February 12, 2009, it was announced that Matthew Goode would be playing the role of Declan O'Callaghan, the surly innkeeper. On March 18, it was announced that Adam Scott was to play Jeremy Sloane, Anna's long time boyfriend, and that Kaitlin Olson would play Libby, Anna's best friend. 

The film was shot in County Wicklow, Dublin, County Mayo and County Galway, with filming taking place in and around the Aran Islands, Connemara, Temple Bar, Georgian Dublin, Wicklow National Park and Olaf Street, Waterford. 

On October 19, it was announced that Randy Edelman had been chosen to compose the film's score. The decision to choose Edelman came as a surprise, as Tucker had used Barrington Pheloung for two of his previous films, Hilary & Jackie and When Did You Last See Your Father?.

Soundtrack
An audio CD soundtrack for Leap Year was released on the Varèse Sarabande record label on January 12, 2010. That album contains only the original score, composed and conducted by Randy Edelman. The musical selections that were used, and credited at the end of the film, are not available on the CD. Those include:
 "More and More of Your Amor" by Nat "King" Cole (Bitter:Sweet's production released 2009)
 "I Want You" by Kelly Clarkson
 "I'll Tell My Ma" by the Colonials featuring Candice Gordon
 "The Irish Rover" by the Colonials featuring Candice Gordon
 "Day to Day" by Eulogies
 "Waltz with Anna" by the Brombies
 "Patsy Fagan" by Dessie O'Halloran and Sharon Shannon
 "Within a Mile of Home" by Flogging Molly
 "Buffalo Gals" by the Brombies
 "A Pint for Breakfast" by the Brombies
 "Leaping Lizards" by the Brombies
 "The Staunton Lick" by Lemon Jelly
 "Dream a Little Dream" cover by Cass Elliot
 "Only Love Can Break Your Heart" by Gwyneth Herbert
 "Never Forget You" by Noisettes
 "You Got Me" by Colbie Caillat, over the closing scene/credits
 "Just Say Yes" by Snow Patrol, used in the trailer

Release
The film opened at the American box office at number 6, with a modest US$9,202,815, behind blockbusters Avatar, Sherlock Holmes, Alvin and the Chipmunks: The Squeakquel, as well as Daybreakers and It's Complicated. The film's final gross of US$25,918,920 in the United States against a production budget of US$19,000,000. In addition to this, the film made US$6,688,396 in international markets, for a final worldwide gross of US$32,607,316.

Leap Year was released on DVD in the United States on May 4, 2010. It debuted at number 4 on the American DVD rentals chart, with a first week rental index of 56.63. It placed 5th on the DVD sales chart, selling an estimated 159,843 units, and has sold almost 800,000 units in total to April 2013.<ref>Leap Year - DVD Sales. The Numbers. Retrieved 2013-04-07.</ref>

Reception
On Rotten Tomatoes the film has an approval rating of 23% and an average rating of 4.30/10 based on reviews from 141 critics. The site's critical consensus is that: "Amy Adams is as appealing as ever, but her charms aren't enough to keep Leap Year from succumbing to an overabundance of clichés and an unfunny script'." On Metacritic the film has a weighted average score out of 33 out of 100, based on 30 reviews. Audiences surveyed by CinemaScore gave the film a grade B on scale of A to F.

Roger Ebert of the Chicago Sun-Times gave it three out of four stars, and described Leap Year as a 'full-bore, PG-rated, sweet rom-com'. 'It sticks to the track, makes all the scheduled stops, and bears us triumphantly to the station'. Owen Gleiberman of Entertainment Weekly gave the film a B− grade, stating that the film could have used more 'pizzazz'.

Nathan Rabin of The A.V. Club, gave it a grade of C− and concluded, "The film functions as the cinematic equivalent of a Shamrock Shake: sickeningly, artificially sweet, formulaic, and about as authentically Gaelic as an Irish Spring commercial".
A. O. Scott of The New York Times saw it as "so witless, charmless, and unimaginative, that it can be described as a movie only in a strictly technical sense".
Richard Roeper gave it a C−, stating that it had a 'Recycled plot, lame sight gags, Leprechaun-like stock Irish characters,' adding that 'The charms of Amy Adams rescue Leap Year from Truly Awful status'.

Donald Clarke of The Irish Times'' gave the film one star out of five, and in a scathing review, described it as 'offensive, reactionary, patronising filth' and cited the film as evidence that 'Hollywood is incapable of seeing the Irish as anything but IRA men or twinkly rural imbeciles'. Paul Whitington of the Irish Independent describes the film as "grotesque and insulting paddywhackery" and says Goode is out of his depth as he "struggle[s] badly with his accent".

The film's lead actor Matthew Goode admitted 'I just know that there are a lot of people who will say it is the worst film of 2010' and revealed that the main reason he signed on to the film was so that he could work close to home and be able to see his girlfriend and newborn daughter.

See also 

 Jab We Met

References

External links
 Page from Studio Canal 
 
 
 
 

2010 films
2010 romantic comedy films
American aviation films
American romantic comedy films
English-language Irish films
Films about weddings
Films produced by Roger Birnbaum
Films scored by Randy Edelman
Films set in Boston
Films set in Ireland
Films shot in County Kildare
Films shot in County Wicklow
Films shot in Dublin (city)
Films shot in the Republic of Ireland
Irish romantic comedy films
Spyglass Entertainment films
Films directed by Anand Tucker
Irish aviation films
American comedy road movies
Irish road movies
2010s English-language films
2010s American films